Mitutanka (Matootonah) was the lower Mandan village at the time of the Lewis and Clark Expedition. At the time that Lewis and Clark visited the main chief was Sheheke

After a catastrophic smallpox epidemic, the Nuitadi Mandans of Good Boy moved north and later built Mitutanka at the confluence of the Knife River with the Missouri River. Mitutanka was on the west Bank while the Ruptare town of Ruptare was on the east bank of the Missouri.

References

Lewis and Clark Expedition
Former Native American populated places in the United States
Mandan, Hidatsa, and Arikara Nation
Native American history of North Dakota